The Human Abstract may refer to:

"The Human Abstract" (poem), a 1794 poem by William Blake
The Human Abstract (band), an American metal band
The Human Abstract (EP), a 2005 demo EP by the band
"The Human Abstract", a 1969 song by David Axelrod from Songs of Experience